The Ministry of Intelligence of the Islamic Republic of Iran is the primary intelligence agency of the Islamic Republic of Iran and a member of the Iran Intelligence Community. It is also known as VAJA and previously as VEVAK (Vezarat-e Ettela'at va Amniyat-e Keshvar) or alternatively MOIS. It was initially known as SAVAMA, after it took over the Shah's intelligence apparatus SAVAK. The ministry is one of the three "sovereign" ministerial bodies of Iran due to nature of its work at home and abroad.

History
Reliable and valid information on the ministry is often difficult to obtain. Initially, the organization was known as SAVAMA, and intended to replace SAVAK, Iran's intelligence agency during the rule of the Shah, but it is unclear how much continuity there is between the two organizations—while their role is similar, their underlying ideology is radically different. It is suspected that the new government was initially eager to purge SAVAK elements from the new organization, but that pragmatism eventually prevailed, with many experienced SAVAK personnel being retained in their roles. Former SAVAK staff are believed to have been important in the ministry's infiltration of left-wing dissident groups and of the Iraqi Ba'ath Party.

The formation of the ministry was proposed by Saeed Hajjarian to the government of Mir-Hossein Mousavi and then the parliament. There were debates about which branch of the state should oversee the new institution, and the other options apart from the presidency were the Judiciary system, the Supreme Leader, and Islamic Revolutionary Guard Corps. Finally, the government got the approval of Ayatollah Khomeini to make it a ministry, but a restriction was added to the requirements of the minister: that he must be a doctor of Islam.

The ministry was finally founded on 18 August 1983, either abandoning, silently subsuming, or relegating to hidden existence many small intelligence agencies that had been formed in different governmental organizations. The five ministers since the founding of the ministry, have been Mohammad Reyshahri (under Prime Minister Mir-Hossein Mousavi), Ali Fallahian (under President Ali Akbar Hashemi Rafsanjani), Ghorbanali Dorri-Najafabadi (under President Mohammad Khatami, resigned after a year), Ali Younessi (under President Khatami, until 24 August 2005), Gholam Hossein Mohseni-Ejehei (under President Mahmoud Ahmadinejad, from 24 August 2005 to 24 August 2009) and Heyder Moslehi (under President Mahmoud Ahmadinejad, from 29 August 2009 to 15 August 2013).

"Chain" assassinations

In late 1998, three dissident writers, a political leader and his wife were killed in Iran in the span of two months.

After great public outcry and journalistic investigation in Iran and publicity internationally, prosecutors announced in mid-1999 that one Saeed Emami had led "rogue elements" in Iran's intelligence ministry in the killings, but that Emami was now dead, having committed suicide in prison. In a trial that was "dismissed as a sham by the victims' families and international human rights organisations", three intelligence ministry agents were sentenced in 2001 to death and twelve others to prison terms for murdering two of the victims. Two years later, the Iranian Supreme Court reduced two of the death sentences to life.

Foreign executions
Massoud Molavi Verdanjani, an on-line opposition activist, was shot and killed on a street in Istanbul's Shishli neighborhood on Thursday, Nov. 14, 2019. A Turkish security official later claimed Verdanjani's suspected killer had confessed to acting under the orders of two Iranian intelligence officers at the Iranian consulate in Turkey.

On April 20, 2022, According to a statement issued by the semi-official Fars news agency, Iran's intelligence ministry stated it had captured three Mossad spies.

List of Ministers

See also
The Iran Cables (2019)
Chain murders of Iran
 Oghab 2
 SAVAK

References

Further reading
 Yves Bonnet, Vevak, au service des ayatollahs: Histoire des services secrets iraniens, Timée-éditions, Boulogne-Billancourt, 2009. .

External links

 Ministry of Intelligence (MOI) official site

 
1983 establishments in Iran
Intelligence
Human rights abuses in Iran
Iran
Iranian intelligence agencies
Iranian security organisations
Ministries established in 1983